Percy Commey (born 7 February 1960, in Accra) is a Ghanaian professional feather/super featherweight boxer of the 1970s, '80s, '90s and 2000s who won the Ghanaian featherweight title, African Boxing Union featherweight, and Commonwealth featherweight title, and was a challenger for the Ghanaian super featherweight title, and West African Boxing Union super featherweight title against Smith Odoom, his professional fighting weight varied from , i.e. featherweight to , i.e. super featherweight.

References

External links

1960 births
Featherweight boxers
Living people
Boxers from Accra
Super-featherweight boxers
Ghanaian male boxers
African Boxing Union champions